Massachusetts elected its members November 7, 1828.

The majority requirement for election was met in all 13 districts in 1828.

See also 
 1828 and 1829 United States House of Representatives elections
 List of United States representatives from Massachusetts

Notes 

1828
Massachusetts
United States House of Representatives